CJIQ-FM, is a Canadian radio station based in Kitchener, Ontario. It is the campus radio station of the city's Conestoga College.

History
The station was granted an instructional license from the Canadian Radio-television and Telecommunications Commission in 1999, and signed on for testing in November 2000. It officially launched on January 8, 2001.

The station broadcasts at 88.3 FM at a power of 4,000 watts from the CIII-TV Global tower in Ayr. CJIQ can also be heard on Rogers Digital Cable 947. CJIQ-FM's mandate is to provide a "living lab" for students of both the broadcasting and journalism programs at Conestoga College.

Branding
Originally, the station was known as "The Condor", taken from Conestoga College's sports teams' name.

In 2006, CJIQ dropped the Condor name to try and diversify itself as a stand-alone radio station. Simply referred to now as "The Tri-Cities Alternative." This is in reference to the fact that the station primarily serves the area of Kitchener, Waterloo and Cambridge, commonly referred to as the Tri-Cities, although CJIQ can also be heard in Guelph and the rest of Waterloo Region, as well as neighbouring Brant County.

Programming
The station broadcasts a modern rock format for the majority of its programming. During the evenings, the station features different genres of music.  Special block programs include Armed and Amped, Punk Rock Academy, Anger Management, Static Hype,  The Indie Rock Invasion Show, Canada Rocks, Aggressive Tendencies, Planet Prog, "Pull the Plug", Vibes Radio,  and Songs from a Quiet Place.

CJIQ serves all of Waterloo Region through its information and news programming. CJIQ is professionally operated by students and volunteers in the community. The station provides students with a view of what to expect upon graduation from their chosen program.

CJIQ is heavily involved with the indie music scene in Kitchener-Waterloo and throughout Southern Ontario. The station has actively supported local musicians, including Lifestory Monologue, The Decay, Breaching Vista, Saigon Hookers, The Droops, The Stars Here, Rob Szabo as well as dozens of other local bands that would otherwise not receive airplay on FM radio.

References

External links
 88.3 CJIQ
 
 

Jiq
Jiq
Conestoga College
Radio stations established in 2001
2001 establishments in Ontario